Agrotis plumiger is a moth of the family Noctuidae first described by Martin Krüger in 2005. It is endemic to Lesotho.

External links
 
Kruger, M. (March 2005)."New genera and species of noctuid moths from Lesotho (Lepidoptera: Noctuoidea: Noctuidae)". African Entomology. 13 (1): 97-142.

Agrotis
Endemic fauna of Lesotho
Moths of Africa
Moths described in 2005